30 Persei is a binary star system in the northern constellation Perseus. It is faintly visible to the naked eye with an apparent visual magnitude of 5.49. It is a member of the Perseus OB3 association, which includes the Alpha Persei Cluster.

This is a single-lined spectroscopic binary star system with an orbital period of 36.5 days and an eccentricity of roughly 0.3. The visible component is a B-type main-sequence star with a stellar classification of B7 V. It is spinning rapidly with a projected rotational velocity of 212 km/s. The star has 4.2 times the mass of the Sun and is radiating around 611 times the Sun's luminosity from its photosphere at an effective temperature of 9,908 K.

References

B-type main-sequence stars
Spectroscopic binaries
Alpha Persei Cluster
Perseus (constellation)
Durchmusterung objects
Persei, 30
020315
015338
0982